Al-Hamadaniah Olympic Swimming and Diving Complex is a water sports centre in Aleppo, Syria, featuring an outdoor Olympic size swimming and diving pools with a seating capacity of 1,340 spectators. The complex was opened in 2009, as part of the al-Hamadaniah Sports City. The swimming complex has a total area of 12,500 m².

Facilities
Current:
Outdoor swimming pool with 10 lanes, 25x50 meters.
Outdoor diving pool, 15x25 meters, 5.5 meters-deep with a 14 meters-high diving tower.
Outdoor children's pool.
Future:
Indoor swimming pool with 10 lanes, 25x50 meters, with a capacity of 2,000 seats.
Indoor diving pool, 15x25 meters, 5.5 meters-deep.
Indoor training pool of 10x25 meters.

References

Sports venues in Aleppo
Swimming venues in Syria
Sports venues completed in 2009